There are four manga adaptations of the Densha Otoko novel. All four adaptations are based on the purportedly true story of a 23-year-old otaku who intervened when a drunk man was harassing several women on a train. The otaku ultimately begins dating one of the women. The four adaptations in order of publication are Train_Man: Densha Otoko by Hidenori Hara; Densha Otoko: The Story of a Train Man Who Fell in Love With A Girl by Wataru Watanabe; Train_Man: Go, Poison Man! written by Hitori Nakano and illustrated by Daisuke Dōke and Train_Man: A Shōjo Manga by Machiko Ocha.



Volume list

Train_Man: Densha Otoko
 is written and illustrated by Hidenori Hara.  It was serialized in Shogakukan's Young Sunday from January 6, 2005. Shogakukan released the manga's three tankōbon volumes between April 5, 2005 and September 5, 2005. It was licensed in North America by Viz Media, which released the manga's three tankōbon volumes between October 10, 2006 and February 13, 2007. It is licensed in France by Kurokawa, in Spain by Glènat España and in Germany by Carlsen Comics.

Densha Otoko: The Story of a Train Man Who Fell in Love With A Girl
 is written and illustrated by Wataru Watanabe. It was serialized in Akita Shoten's Champion Red from January 19, 2005. Akita Shoten released the manga's three tankōbon volumes between March 20, 2005 and February 20, 2006. The manga is licensed in North America by CMX, which released the manga's three tankōbon volumes between October 11, 2006 and April 30, 2007. It is licensed in France by Taifu Comics.

Train_Man: Go, Poison Man!
 is written by Hitori Nakano and illustrated by Daisuke Dōke. It was serialized in Akita Shoten's Weekly Shōnen Champion from December 28, 2004. Akita Shoten released the manga's three tankōbon volumes between March 20, 2005 and January 20, 2006. It is available in English as a scanlation.

Train_Man: A Shōjo Manga
 is a one shot shōjo manga written and illustrated by Machiko Ocha. Kodansha released the manga on June 13, 2005. The manga is licensed in North America by Del Rey Manga, which released the manga on November 7, 2006.

References

Densha Otoko